Rapid transit in Spain consists of four metro systems, two hybrid metro-suburban systems, and several tram/light rail systems.

Rapid transit systems

Hybrid metro/suburban systems

References